The Swimming competition at the 2006 Asian Games took place December 2–7 at the Hamad Aquatic Centre in Doha, Qatar. It featured 38 events (19 male, 19 female), all conducted in a long course (50m) pool.

Schedule

Medalists

Men

Women

Medal table

Participating nations
A total of 313 athletes from 34 nations competed in swimming at the 2006 Asian Games:

References

External links

 
2006 Asian Games events
Asian Games
2006
Swimming competitions in Qatar